Războieni is a commune in Neamț County, Western Moldavia, Romania. It is composed of five villages: Borșeni, Războieni, Războienii de Jos, Valea Albă, and Valea Mare.

The commune is located in the central-east part of the county, on the banks of the river Valea Albă. Războieni is crossed by the county road DJ208G, which connects it to the south to Dragomirești, Ștefan cel Mare, and Girov (where it ends in ) and to the east to Tupilați.

1476 Battle of Valea Albă
The Battle of Valea Albă, also known as the Battle of Războieni, took place at Războieni on July 26, 1476, between the Moldavian army of Stephen the Great and the invading Ottoman Turks under Sultan Mehmed the Conqueror, who won the day.

The  is located in the village of Valea Albă. The monastery's Holy Archangel Michael Church was built by Stephen the Great to commemorate that battle, 20 years later. Dedicated on November 8, 1496, the church rests on a sanctuary holding the remains of the Moldavian soldiers fallen there.

Natives
 Constantin Virgil Gheorghiu (1916–1992), writer

References

Communes in Neamț County
Localities in Western Moldavia